The United States Capitol rotunda is the tall central rotunda of the United States Capitol in Washington, D.C. It has been described as the Capitol's "symbolic and physical heart". Built between 1818 and 1824, the rotunda is located below the Capitol dome, which was built between 1857 and 1866.

The rotunda is connected by corridors leading south to the House of Representatives and north to the Senate chambers. To the immediate south is the semi-circular National Statuary Hall, which was the House of Representatives chamber until 1857. To the northeast is the Old Senate Chamber, used by the Senate until 1859 and by the Supreme Court until 1935.

The space is a national showcase of art, and includes numerous historical paintings and sculptures. It is also used for ceremonial events authorized by concurrent resolution, including the lying in state of honored dead.

Design and construction

 

The doctor and architect William Thornton was the winner of the contest to design the Capitol in 1793. Thornton had first conceived the idea of a central rotunda. However, due to lack of funds or resources, oft-interrupted construction, and the British attack on Washington during the War of 1812, work on the rotunda did not begin until 1818. The rotunda was completed in 1824 under Architect of the Capitol Charles Bulfinch, as part of a series of new buildings and projects in preparation for the final visit of Marquis de Lafayette in 1824. The rotunda was designed in the neoclassical style and was intended to evoke the design of the Pantheon.

Walter had also designed the Capitol's north and south extensions. Work on the dome began in 1856, and in 1859, Walter redesigned the rotunda to consist of an inner and outer dome, with a canopy suspended between them that would be visible through an oculus at the top of the inner dome. In 1862, Walter asked painter Constantino Brumidi to design "a picture  in diameter, painted in fresco, on the concave canopy over the eye of the New Dome of the U.S. Capitol". At this time, Brumidi may have added a watercolor canopy design over Walter's tentative 1859 sketch. The dome was being finished in the middle of the American Civil War and was constructed from fireproof cast iron. During the Civil War, the rotunda was used as a military hospital for Union soldiers. The dome was finally completed in 1866.

The crypt 
Originally the crypt had an open ceiling into the rotunda. Visitors can still see the holes in the stone circle that marked the rim of the open space in the rotunda floor. Underneath the floor of the crypt lies a tomb that was the intended burial place for George Washington but after a lengthy battle with his estate and the state of Virginia the plans for him to be buried in the crypt were abandoned.

Renovation

In January 2013, the Architect of the Capitol announced a four-year, $10 million project to repair and conserve the Capitol Dome's exterior and the Capitol rotunda. The proposal required the stripping of lead paint from the interior of the dome, repair to the ironwork, repainting of the interior of the dome, rehabilitation of the interstitial space between the dome and rotunda, and installation of new lighting in the interstitial space and the rotunda. The dome and rotunda, which were last conserved in 1960, were showing significant signs of rust and disrepair. There was a danger that decorative ironwork could have fallen from the rotunda to the space below, and that weather-related problems could damage the artwork in the rotunda. Without immediate repair, safety netting was installed, temporarily blocking the rotunda's artwork from view.

Historical paintings
Eight niches in the rotunda hold large, framed historical paintings. All are oil-on-canvas and measure . Four of these are scenes from the American Revolution, painted by John Trumbull, who was commissioned by Congress to do the work in 1817. These are Declaration of Independence, Surrender of General Burgoyne, Surrender of Lord Cornwallis, and General George Washington Resigning His Commission. These were placed between 1819 and 1824. Between 1840 and 1855, four more paintings were added. These depicted the exploration and colonization of America and were all done by different artists. These paintings are Landing of Columbus by John Vanderlyn, Discovery of the Mississippi by William Henry Powell, Baptism of Pocahontas by John Gadsby Chapman, and Embarkation of the Pilgrims by Robert Walter Weir.

Apotheosis of Washington

The Apotheosis of Washington is a large fresco by Greek-Italian Constantino Brumidi, visible through the oculus of the dome of the rotunda. The fresco depicts George Washington sitting exalted amongst the heavens.

Frieze of American History
The Frieze of American History is painted to appear as a carved stone bas-relief frieze but is actually a trompe-l'œil fresco cycle depicting 19 scenes from American history. The "frieze" occupies a band immediately below the 36 windows. Brumidi designed the frieze and prepared a sketch in 1859 but did not begin painting until 1878. Brumidi painted seven and a half scenes. While working on William Penn and the Indians, Brumidi fell off the scaffolding and held on to a rail for 15 minutes until he was rescued. He died a few months later in 1880. After Brumidi's death, Filippo Costaggini was commissioned to complete the eight and a half remaining scenes in Brumidi's sketches. He finished in 1889 and left a  gap due to an error in Brumidi's original design. In 1951, Allyn Cox completed the frieze.

Except for the last three panels named by Allyn Cox, the scenes have no particular titles and many variant titles have been given. The names given here are the names used by the Architect of the Capitol, which uses the names that Brumidi used most frequently in his letters and that were used in Edward Clark and by newspaper articles. The 19 panels are:

Statues

From the Statuary Hall Collection
Among the group of eleven statues currently encircling the rotunda against the wall at floor level are seven from the National Statuary Hall Collection:

George Washington, in bronze, from Virginia, by Jean Antoine Houdon (copy cast in 1934).
Andrew Jackson in bronze, from Tennessee, by Belle Kinney Sholz and Leopold F. Sholz, in 1928.
James Garfield in marble, from Ohio, by Charles Niehaus in 1886.
Dwight D. Eisenhower in bronze, from Kansas, by Jim Brothers in 2003.
Ronald Reagan in bronze, from California, by Chas Fagan in 2009.
Gerald Ford in bronze, from Michigan, by J. Brett Grill in 2011.
Harry S. Truman in bronze, from Missouri, by Tom Corbin in 2022.

These seven statues representing the presidents will remain in the rotunda indefinitely or until an act of Congress.

George Washington
A statue of George Washington – a copy after French neo-classical sculptor Jean-Antoine Houdon's 1790 full-length marble in the Virginia State Capitol – holds a prominent place. William James Hubard created a plaster copy after Houdon, that stood in the Rotunda from the late-1850s to 1934. It is now in the Smithsonian American Art Museum. The present bronze copy replaced Hubard's plaster copy in 1934.

James Garfield
James Garfield was the last American president to be born in a log cabin. Sculptor Niehaus returned to America in 1881 and by virtue of being a native Ohioan was commissioned to sculpt a monument to the recently assassinated President James Garfield, who was also from Ohio.

Bust of Martin Luther King, Jr.

Because the bust would be such an important and visible work of art, the Joint Committee on the Library decided to have a national competition to select a sculptor.

On December 21, 1982, the Congress passed House Concurrent Resolution 153, which directed the procurement of a marble bust "to serve to memorialize King's contributions on such matters as the historic legislation of the 1960s affecting civil rights and the right to vote". Senator Charles Mathias, Jr., chairman of the Joint Committee on the Library, the congressional committee overseeing the procurement, said at the unveiling that "Martin Luther King takes his rightful place among the heroes of this nation."

John Woodrow Wilson, the artist was awarded a $50,000 commission to cast the model in bronze. The bust was unveiled in the Rotunda on January 16, 1986, the fifty-seventh anniversary of King's birth, by Mrs. King, accompanied by their four children and King's sister.

Women's suffrage
This group portrait monument is known formally as the Portrait Monument to Lucretia Mott, Elizabeth Cady Stanton, and Susan B. Anthony, pioneers of the women's suffrage movement in the United States. Their efforts, and the work of later suffrage activists like Alice Paul, eventually led to the passage of the 19th Amendment in 1920. The work was sculpted by Adelaide Johnson (1859–1955) from a  block of marble in Carrara, Italy. The portraits are copies of the individual busts she carved for the Court of Honor of the Woman's Building at the World's Columbian Exposition in 1893. The detailed busts are surrounded by rough-hewn marble at the top of the sculpture. This part of the statue, according to some, is left unfinished representing the unfinished work of women's rights. Contrary to a popular story, the intention was not that it be completed upon the ascension of the first female President — the rough-hewn section is too small to carry a proportional bust. The monument was presented to the Capitol as a gift from the women of the United States by the National Woman's Party and was accepted on behalf of Congress by the Joint Committee on the Library on February 10, 1921. The unveiling ceremony was held in the Rotunda on February 15, 1921, the 101st anniversary of the birth of Susan B. Anthony, and was attended by representatives of over 70 women's organizations. Shortly after its unveiling, however, the statue was moved into the Capitol Crypt. It remained on display there for 75 years, until HCR 216 ordered it moved to the Rotunda. The statue was placed in its current location, in the Rotunda, in May 1997.

Other statuary and artifacts
In addition to the National Statuary Hall Collection and the memorial statuary, there are a number of other pieces in the Rotunda. Next to the south entrance, opposite of the statue of George Washington, is a bronze statue of Thomas Jefferson with the Declaration of Independence. Donated by Uriah P. Levy, it is the only work of art in the Capitol given by a private donor. At the west entrance, are marble statues of General Ulysses S. Grant and President Abraham Lincoln. The Lincoln statue was a commissioned by Congress and designed by Vinnie Ream. The statue of Grant was a gift to Congress by the Grand Army of the Republic.

Lying in state and honor

The main difference between lying in state and lying in honor is whether the person was an elected official or military officer versus being a private citizen. The designated guard of honor that keeps watch over the casket also differs. When a person lies in state, a guard of honor from the United States Armed Forces watches over the casket; when a person lies in honor, the United States Capitol Police watches as a civilian guard of honor over the casket.

Lain in state
Government officials and military officers to have lain in state in the Capitol rotunda are as follows:

 Henry Clay (July 1, 1852)
 Abraham Lincoln (April 19–21, 1865)
 Thaddeus Stevens (August 13–14, 1868)
 Charles Sumner (March 13, 1874)
 Henry Wilson (November 25–26, 1875)
 James A. Garfield (September 21–23, 1881)
 John Alexander Logan (December 30–31, 1886)
 William McKinley (September 17, 1901)
 Pierre Charles L'Enfant (April 28, 1909)
 George Dewey (January 20, 1917)
 Unknown Soldier of World War I (November 9–11, 1921)
 Warren G. Harding (August 8, 1923)
 William Howard Taft (March 11, 1930)
 John Joseph Pershing (July 18–19, 1948)
 Robert Alphonso Taft (August 2–3, 1953)
 Unknown Soldiers of World War II and the Korean War (May 28–30, 1958)
 John F. Kennedy (November 24–25, 1963)
 Douglas MacArthur (April 8–9, 1964)
 Herbert Hoover (October 23–25, 1964)
 Dwight D. Eisenhower (March 30–31, 1969)
 Everett McKinley Dirksen (September 9–10, 1969)
 J. Edgar Hoover (May 3–4, 1972)
 Lyndon B. Johnson (January 24–25, 1973)
 Hubert Humphrey (January 14–15, 1978)
 Unknown Soldier of the Vietnam War, later identified as Michael Blassie (May 25–28, 1984)
 Claude Denson Pepper (June 1–2, 1989)
 Ronald Reagan (June 9–11, 2004)
 Gerald Ford (December 30, 2006 – January 2, 2007)
 Daniel Ken Inouye (December 20, 2012)
 John McCain (August 31, 2018)
 George H. W. Bush (December 3–5, 2018)
 John Lewis (July 27–28, 2020)
 Bob Dole (December 9, 2021)
 Harry Reid (January 12, 2022)

Ruth Bader Ginsburg, Elijah Cummings and Don Young have lain in state on the grounds of the United States Capitol inside of National Statuary Hall.

Lain in honor
Private citizens to have lain in honor in the United States Capitol Rotunda are as follows:
 Jacob Chestnut and John Gibson (July 28, 1998)
 Rosa Parks (October 30–31, 2005)
 Billy Graham (February 28 – March 1, 2018)
 Brian Sicknick (February 2–3, 2021)
 William Evans (April 13, 2021)
 Hershel W. Williams (July 14, 2022)

Other notable individuals, several of them being the chief justice of the United States, have lain in state in the United States Supreme Court Building while other individuals such as Ronald H. Brown, have lain in state in the Herbert C. Hoover Building.

References

External links
 Capitol Rotunda from the Architect of the Capitol website

Rotunda
Government buildings with domes
Rotundas in the United States
Articles containing video clips